The United States ambassador to North Macedonia is the official representative of the president of the United States to the head of state of North Macedonia.

The Ambassador, based out of Skopje, works with the rest of the embassy - 70 other Americans and 240 locals - to advance bilateral relations.

The United States established a liaison office in what was then the Republic of Macedonia in Skopje on 3 December 1993 with Victor D. Comras appointed soon after as Charge and US chief of Mission with the equivalent rank of Ambassador. The U.S. formally recognized Macedonia as an independent state on 9 February 1994.

Ambassadors and chiefs of mission

See also
North Macedonia–United States relations
Foreign relations of North Macedonia
Ambassadors of the United States

References

United States Department of State: Background notes on Macedonia

External links
 United States Department of State: Chiefs of Mission for Macedonia
 United States Department of State: Macedonia
 United States Embassy in Skopje

North Macedonia

United States